Torodora meifengensis is a moth in the family Lecithoceridae. It was described by Kyu-Tek Park, John B. Heppner and Yang-Seop Bae and 2014. It is found in Taiwan.

References

Moths described in 2014
Torodora